Cambarus pyronotus, the fireback crayfish, is a species of crayfish in the family Cambaridae. It is found in North America.

References

Further reading

 
 
 

Cambaridae
Articles created by Qbugbot
Freshwater crustaceans of North America
Crustaceans described in 1978